NCAA College Football 2K3 is a 2002 American football video game published by Sega. The cover athlete is former Nebraska Cornhuskers quarterback Eric Crouch. It is the second college football game by Visual Concepts (the first being NCAA College Football 2K2: Road to the Rose Bowl).

Reception 

The game received "average" reviews on all platforms according to the review aggregation website Metacritic.

References

External links 
 

2002 video games
College football video games
GameCube games
NCAA video games
North America-exclusive video games
PlayStation 2 games
Sega video games
Video games developed in the United States
Xbox games